Arran is one of the nine wards used to elect members of the North Ayrshire council. It was re-established for the 2022 Scottish local elections following the implementation of the Islands (Scotland) Act 2018. Between 2007 and 2022, the ward was part of Ardrossan and Arran.

Councillors

Election results

2022
At the previous election, Arran was included in a ward representing Ardrossan and Arran. The newly created Arran ward resulted in a Conservative win.

Notes

References

Wards of North Ayrshire
Isle of Arran